The  is an electric multiple unit (EMU) train type operated by Hokkaido Railway Company (JR Hokkaido) on suburban services in the Sapporo area of Hokkaido, Japan, since 1 June 2012.

Variants
 733-0 series: 3-car sets operated since June 2012
 733-1000 series: 3-car sets to be operated on Hakodate Liner shinkansen access services from March 2016
 733-3000 series: 6-car sets operated on Airport rapid services since July 2014

Design
Similar in appearance to the aluminium-bodied 735 series EMUs built in 2010, the 733 series EMUs have stainless steel bodies with steel driving cab ends. Sets B-113 onward, delivered from September 2013, feature full-colour LED destination indicators, instead of the three-colour indicators used on earlier sets.

These sets include a "u Seat" car with unidirectional reclining seating for reserved seat passengers. The new sets feature LED lighting in the passenger areas.

Operations

The 733 series sets entered service from 1 June 2012 on suburban services in the Sapporo area of Hokkaido, including the newly electrified Sasshō Line. They are capable of running in multiple with 721 series, 731 series, and 735 series EMUs. However, unlike the 731 series, they cannot operate in multiple with the KiHa 201 series DMUs also used on the Sasshō Line.

Formations
, the fleet consists of 21 three-car sets, numbered B-101 to B-121, and seven six-car 733-1000 series sets, numbered B-3101 to B-3107, formed as shown below, with one motored ("M") intermediate car and two non-powered trailer ("T") cars. Car 1 is at the Takikawa/Tomakomai end.

3-car sets (B-101 – B-121)

 Car 1 has a universal access toilet.
 Car 2 is fitted with an N-PS785 single-arm pantograph.

3-car 733-1000 series sets (B-1001 – B-1004)

The fleet of four three-car 733-1000 series sets are formed as shown below, with car 1 at the Hakodate end.

 Car 1 has a universal access toilet.
 Car 2 is fitted with a single-arm pantograph.

6-car 733-3000 series sets (B-3101/3201 – B-3107/3207)

Seven six-car 733-3000 series sets are formed as shown below with two motored ("M") cars and four non-powered trailer ("T") cars. The sets each consist of two 3-car half sets, numbered "B-310x" and "B-320x", with car 1 at the Shin-Chitose end.

 Car 4 has "u Seat" unidirectional reclining seating.
 Car 1 has a toilet, and car 3 has a universal access toilet.
 Cars 2 and car 5 are each fitted with an N-PS785 single-arm pantograph.

Interior
The 3-car sets have longitudinal bench seating throughout, with a total capacity of 439 (148 seated).

Bogies

History

The first two 3-car sets, B-101 and B-102, were delivered from the Kawasaki Heavy Industries factory in Kobe in February 2012, with two more sets, B-103 and B-104, delivered later the same month. Twelve more sets (36 vehicles) are scheduled to be delivered during fiscal 2014.

The first 733-3000 series six-car sets entered service on 19 July 2014.

The first two 733-1000 series three-car sets, B-1001 and B-1002, were delivered from the Kawasaki Heavy Industries factory in Kobe in October 2015.

Build details

The official delivery dates for the fleet are as shown below.

References

Electric multiple units of Japan
Train-related introductions in 2012
Hokkaido Railway Company
20 kV AC multiple units
Kawasaki multiple units